Muhamad Hafizal bin Mohamad @ Alias (born 21 January 1993) is a Malaysian professional footballer who captains Malaysia Super League club Perak. He plays as a defender.

Career statistics

Club

Honours
Terengganu
Malaysia Super League runner-up: 2022
Malaysia Cup runner-up: 2018
Malaysia Premier League runner-up: 2017

References

External links

1993 births
Living people
People from Terengganu
Malaysian footballers
Association football defenders
Terengganu FC players
Terengganu F.C. II players
Perak F.C. players
Malaysia Super League players
Malaysia Premier League players